KTVZ (channel 21) is a television station in Bend, Oregon, United States, serving Central Oregon as an affiliate of NBC and The CW Plus. It is owned by the News-Press & Gazette Company (NPG) alongside two low-power stations: Class A Fox affiliate KFXO-CD (channel 39) and Telemundo affiliate KQRE-LD (channel 20). The stations share studios on Northwest O. B. Riley Road in Bend, while KTVZ's transmitter is located on Awbrey Butte west of US 97.

History
KTVZ went on-the-air November 6, 1977. It was started by former owners Ray Johnson of KMED-AM-TV (now KTVL) in Medford and C. Howard Lane from KOIN-TV in Portland who formed Ponderosa Broadcasting, Inc. The station has always been an NBC affiliate but also began to carry CBS programming on a secondary basis. Efforts to carve out Deschutes County from the Portland television market began in 1980. By fall 1981, Nielsen formed the newly created Bend DMA. Sierra Cascade Communications sold the station to Stainless Broadcasting Company in 1986 which later became known as Northwest Broadcasting in 1997 based in Spokane, Washington.

By 1997, KTVZ discontinued CBS programming since KOIN in Portland (now seen through semi-satellite KBNZ-LD, channel 7) already had full translator and cable coverage in the Bend area. Later in 2002, Northwest Broadcasting sold KTVZ to the News-Press & Gazette Company. By 2006, they added more network affiliations to the growing Central Oregon area when The CW was added as a second digital channel. In late 2006, it was announced that Meredith would sell KFXO to the News-Press & Gazette Company which occurred on May 24, 2007. BendBroadband filed a petition with Federal Communications Commission (FCC) to block the proposed sale but it still went through. KQRE-LP was originally a repeater of KTVZ. In January 2007, that station completed a transmitter move that brought it closer to Bend making the rebroadcast redundant. The station then began airing Telemundo's schedule.

Programming

Syndicated programming
Syndicated programming on KTVZ (as of 2023) includes Live with Kelly and Ryan, Dr. Phil, Extra, Tamron Hall, The Kelly Clarkson Show, and Family Feud, among others. KTVZ is one of the few NBC affiliates that air paid programming on weekdays.

Newscasts

On June 22, 2007, KFXO's own prime time news at 10 p.m. was replaced by one produced by KTVZ. In September of that year, this station began to air its newscasts in 16:9 widescreen format. It broadcasts five hours of local news every weekday. It produces a two-hour weekday morning show and nightly hour-long newscast for KFXO.

Notable former staff
Lisa Verch Fletcher
Kayna Whitworth
Ryan Bennett (now deceased)

Technical information

Subchannels
The station's digital signal is multiplexed:

Analog-to-digital conversion
KTVZ shut down its analog signal, over UHF channel 21, on June 12, 2009, the official date in which full-power television stations in the United States transitioned from analog to digital broadcasts under federal mandate. The station's digital signal relocated from its pre-transition UHF channel 18 to channel 21.

Translators
KTVZ is rebroadcast on the following translator stations:

Low-power analog translators in Burns, Chemult, La Pine, and Madras have been discontinued.

See also
Channel 12 branded TV stations in the United States
Channel 21 digital TV stations in the United States
Channel 21 virtual TV stations in the United States

References

External links

Bend CW website

NBC network affiliates
Television channels and stations established in 1977
TVZ
News-Press & Gazette Company
1977 establishments in Oregon